The colonial service Defender-class torpedo boats were designed by Thornycroft & Company for the defence of New Zealand, built at Chiswick in 1883 and shipped to New Zealand. They were quickly obsolete and were left to deteriorate in situ. The remains of Defender are preserved at the Lyttelton Torpedo Boat Museum.

Construction
Acquired for the external defence of New Zealand, at a cost of about £3,200 each, all four boats were built and engined by John I. Thornycroft & Company at Church Wharf, Chiswick on the River Thames.

Armament
As built the class was armed with a single McEvoy spar torpedo, which was designed to be rammed into a vessel and explode beneath the waterline.  A single 2-barrelled Nordenfelt gun comprised the total gun armament.  The last pair had 18-inch Whitehead torpedoes fitted at build, and these were later retrofitted to Defender and Taiaroa.

Transport to New Zealand
On 1 February 1884 the first pair were shipped aboard the sailing ship Lyttelton from London to  Port Chalmers, New Zealand.  The second pair followed on 3 May 1884.

Operational lives
Torpedo Corps units of the Permanent Militia were formed to operate the boats at the four main ports of Lyttelton (Defender), Port Chalmers (Taiaroa), Devonport (Waitemata) and  Wellington (Poneke), each with its boatshed and slipway.  The boats quickly became obsolete and by 1900 had largely been left to rot.

Ships

See also
 Early naval vessels of New Zealand

References

Sources
The New Zealand Maritime Index

External links

 
Ships built in Chiswick
Torpedo boat classes